Zhou Jin Hua (born 1978) is a Chinese painter.

Biography
Born in Deyang, Sichuan Province in 1978, Graduated from the Department of Oil Painting of Sichuan Fine Arts Institute in 2002. Held many solo exhibitions in art galleries or salons in Germany, Hong Kong, Beijing, Shanghai, etc.

He is an artist who is currently working and living in Beijing and Chongqing. He analyses diverse facades and changes of Chinese society. Observations of sometimes shocking, sometimes ironic scenarios which are more or less hidden on the canvas are characteristic for his works. Inspired by the traditional Chinese landscape painting, the artist ever depicts his observations by using the bird's eye perspective. According to his experience only out of a certain spatial distance social circumstances and actions are understandable. Zhou and his artworks have been featured in various art exhibitions e.g. National Art Museum of China in Beijing (CN), Kunstverein Konstanz (GER)  and Centre Culturel de Rencontre Abbaye de Neumünster (LUX).

Collections and Awards
His works have been collected by numerous private Western and Chinese art collections:
 "What a Big Crevice, 2007", collected in Guangdong Museum of Art
 "Dinner under the Sunset, The Results are the Same in the End No. 5, 2008" collected in Yuz Museum, Indonesia.
 "Golden Age No. 9, 2008" collected in White Rabbit Gallery in Australia.
 "Amitabha Buddha" and "Glory No. 2, 2012" collected and long exhibited in University of Mannheim in Germany.
 "Flame series No.6 and No. 7, 2006" won the Recommendation Award at the 2006 Shanghai Art Fair Young Artists Works Exhibition.
 "After Wind and Rain, 2007" won 2007 Hong Kong LV Asian Art Prize
 "Infinite Scenery, 2010" won the First-Class Award at the Teachers' Category of the Second Art and Design Exhibition of Chinese Universities in 2010.

Publications
 Young Chinese Artists; Christoph Noe et al.; Prestel; 2008 
 Kunstforum International

See also 

 List of Chinese contemporary artists

External links
 Zhou Jin Hua at THE MINISTRY OF ART 
 Zhou Jin Hua featured at Brand Eins 

1978 births
Living people
People's Republic of China painters